The London Oratory ("the Congregation of the Oratory of St Philip Neri in London") is a Catholic community of priests living under the rule of life established by its founder, Philip Neri (1515-1595). It is housed in an Oratory House, next to the Church of the Immaculate Heart of Mary (Brompton Oratory) in the Brompton Road, Royal Borough of Kensington and Chelsea, London, SW7.

There are four other Oratories in the UK, the Birmingham Oratory, the Manchester Oratory, the Oxford Oratory and the York Oratory.

Origins
The London Oratory was founded in 1849, the year after John Henry Cardinal Newman established the Birmingham Oratory, when Newman sent Frederick Faber and some companions, including Thomas Francis Knox, to start an Oratory in London.  The original premises (a former whisky store) were in King William Street (now William IV Street), near Charing Cross. In 1854 the community moved to its present Brompton Road site, adjacent to the Victoria and Albert Museum. The site had previously been owned by Robert Pollard, who had set up a boys’ boarding school there, known as Blemell House. Newman was not initially enthusiastic with a location he considered in, what was then, the suburbs.

An attempt early in 1853 by the Vicar of Holy Trinity, Brompton, to prevent the establishment of a Catholic community so close to his church was unsuccessful. An Oratory House was built in 1854, followed by a large temporary church. The house contained the congregations' chapel, known as "the Little Oratory", decorated in 1871 by John Hungerford Pollen, who, at that time, was connected with the nearby South Kensington Museum.

The church was replaced in 1884 by the present neo-baroque building, designed by Herbert Gribble. Until the opening of Westminster Cathedral in 1903, the London Oratory was the venue for all great Catholic occasions in London, including the funeral of Cardinal Manning in 1892.

Together with their Church of the Immaculate Heart of Mary, the community of the Oratorian Fathers is often popularly, though less accurately, referred to as the 'Brompton Oratory'.

The Oratory parish is part of the Roman Catholic metropolitan diocese of Westminster, at whose request the Oratory parish is run by the Fathers of the Oratory. It is part of the Kensington and Chelsea Deanery.

Oratorian Fathers
The Oratorian Fathers are a congregation of secular priests living a community life together, bound together not by vows, but by the internal bond of charity and by the external bonds of a common life and rule, dominated by prayer and ministry to their city.  There are several masses offered each day and private masses are available by arrangement, as are weddings and funerals. Confessions are also heard daily and priests are always available for counsel and advice. The London Oratory, which is currently served by three choirs, is famous in particular for the solemn celebration of the Roman liturgy, especially in Latin, and for its preservation of the traditional place of music in the liturgy.

List of provosts

The Oratorian Fathers elect a provost from amongst their number to serve as superior for three-year terms. The following have served as Provost of the London Oratory:

 1969–1981: Fr Michael Scott Napier
 1991–1994: Fr Michael Scott Napier
 ????–2012: Fr Ignatius Harrison
 2012–present: Fr Julian Large

Popular culture
The singer/songwriter Nick Cave wrote a lovesong called "Brompton Oratory", set outside and inside the London Oratory, which is included in the Nick Cave and the Bad Seeds' album The Boatman's Call.

See also
 Brompton Oratory - the Church of the Immaculate Heart of Mary
 London Oratory School - School of the London Oratory
 London Oratory School Schola - Children's choir of the London Oratory

References

External links
 

Oratorian communities in the United Kingdom
Oratory